Milad Salem Fakhri (Dari: میلاد سالم, born 3 March 1988) is an Afghan professional footballer who plays for FC Gießen.

Career
Born in Kabul, Salem began his career in the youth set ups of FSV Frankfurt and Kickers Offenbach and in July 2004 moved to Eintracht Frankfurt, where he was  promoted to the reserve team in 2007. In 2010, he joined 3. Liga side SV Wehen Wiesbaden, where he started with the reserves but was quickly promoted to the first team.

On 21 May 2019, Salem joined SV Eintracht Trier 05.

International career
Salem played three games for the Afghanistan national football team in 2008. in 2016, 8 years after his debut, he was again called up for the national team, for a friendly match on 13 November against Tajikistan.

References

External links
 

1988 births
Living people
Footballers from Kabul
German people of Afghan descent
Afghan footballers
Afghanistan international footballers
Afghan expatriate footballers
Eintracht Frankfurt II players
SV Wehen Wiesbaden players
SV Elversberg players
VfL Osnabrück players
Holstein Kiel players
SV Eintracht Trier 05 players
3. Liga players
Regionalliga players
Association football forwards